Hamzeh Kandi (also Romanized as Ḩamzeh Kandī) is a village in Lakestan Rural District, in the Central District of Salmas County, West Azerbaijan Province, Iran. At the 2006 census, its population was 1,000, in 244 families.

References 

Populated places in Salmas County